Pendo is a Kenyan drama television series that airs on NTV and premiered on 3 December 2014. The series is written by Grace danile, produced and distributed by DIL pictures.

Premise
It is a journey with Maria in a story of her return home after 5 years of incarceration at the Women’s Maximum Prison. Her beloved husband, Juma, has taken in another wife - Maria’s former maid – Mwelu. Mwelu as the step-mum “Mama wa Kambo” disintegrates the once close-knit family. Maria, a mother of two, also has to look for her daughter Sita, who is caught up in a survival battle. Moreover, Kongo, her angry teenage son, has been taken in by a local children’s home during Maria’s absence and is getting out of hand as a social misfit.

Cast
Eddie Peter Gebhard as Sudi
Stella Mungai as Pearl
Lawryn Odhiambo as Mwelu
Victoria Wakio Mzenge as Maria
Ambrose Riziki as Sita
Alex Kihayo as Alfonse 
Godfrey Matengo as Kirafa
Daniel Kevin Bwakali as Ephatus
Hadson Mathenge as Lucas
Innocent Njuguna as Lema
Blessing Lungaho

Awards and nominations

References

2014 Kenyan television series debuts
Swahili-language television shows
Kenyan comedy television series
English-language television shows
Kenyan television soap operas
2010s Kenyan television series
NTV (Kenyan TV channel) original programming